Day Watch is a tactical role-playing game developed by Russian developer Nival Interactive, and based on the Russian novel and the film of the same name. It features a group of Light Others trying to combat the schemes of Day Watch.

It is a sequel of the Night Watch game released in Russia in 2007. The game is powered by the Silent Storm engine.

References

2007 video games
Night Watch
Silent Storm engine games
Tactical role-playing video games
Video games developed in Russia
Windows games
Windows-only games
CDV Software Entertainment games
Single-player video games